JAIRO (ジャイロ), which stands for Japanese Institutional Repositories Online, is a web-based search interface that provides aggregated open access to Japanese academic content, including journal articles, theses, research bulletins, and reports. It is administered by Japan's National Institute of Informatics (NII).

History 
A beta version of JAIRO was launched on October 22, 2008, and its official opening was on April 1 of the following year. JAIRO began as the JuNii+ service, which operated from May 2007 until March 2009.

As of September 30, 2015, nearly 1.6 million full-text documents were accessible through JAIRO. Detailed monthly usage statistics can be found on its website.

References 

Bibliographic databases and indexes
Open access (publishing)
Open access projects